Sheila W. Lerwill (born 16 August 1928) is a British athlete who competed mainly in the high jump.

She broke the World record for women's high jump on 7 July 1951 in London with a jump of 1.72 meters, beating the previous record of 1.71 meters set by Fanny Blankers-Koen of the Netherlands on 30 May 1943 in Amsterdam. The record was broken on 22 May 1954 by Aleksandra Chudina of the USSR in Kiev with a jump of 1.73 meters. She competed for Great Britain in the high jump at the 1952 Summer Olympics, held in Helsinki, Finland, where she won the silver medal with a jump of 1.65 metres. It was Britain's best athletics medal at the games.

References

1928 births
Living people
British female high jumpers
Olympic silver medallists for Great Britain
Athletes (track and field) at the 1952 Summer Olympics
Athletes (track and field) at the 1954 British Empire and Commonwealth Games
Olympic athletes of Great Britain
European Athletics Championships medalists
Medalists at the 1952 Summer Olympics
Olympic silver medalists in athletics (track and field)
Commonwealth Games competitors for England